Viola Davis (born 1965) is an American actress.

Viola Davis may also refer to:

Viola Davis (Georgia politician) (born 1963), American politician from Georgia
Viola Davis Brown (1936–2017), nurse and civil rights activist who engaged in politics
Viola Desmond (1914–1965), born Viola Davis, Canadian civil rights activist and businesswoman